Barry Gorman is a collegiate soccer coach. He most recently served as the head men's soccer coach at Penn State University from 1987 to 2009, before being replaced by Bob Warming. He is Penn State's all-time winningest soccer coach, compiling 266 victories in 22 seasons. He is a three time NSCAA Regional Coach of the Year, having won the award in the 1992, 1999, and 2005 seasons. He also won Big Ten Coach of the Year honors in 2005. He has led his team to 13 NCAA tournament appearances, advancing to the round of 16 four times and to the national quarterfinals twice, and three Big 10 regular season championships. Prior to his time as head coach, Gorman also served as an assistant for two years under Walter Bahr.

PSU Coaching Legacy

100 Years, 4 Generations of Penn State Coaching History

Gorman is linked to Coach Bill Jeffrey, the head coach of Penn State University Men's Soccer in the early 20's, who later became the Men's national team head coach in the World Cup. Coach Jeffrey died in 1966 and his coaching lineage worked through four generations at Penn State University. By 1970, the captain of Jeffrey's 1950 USA team, Walter Bahr would become coach at Penn State from 1974 to 1988. His assistant, Barry Gorman, would later succeed him as head coach, keeping the Penn State job through the 2009 season. In 2021, the connection to Jeffrey continues with Coach Gorman's youth player, Fraser Kershaw, who took the head coaching job at Penn State Altoona. The coaching connection reached four separate generations of soccer, reaching a 100-year continual coaching succession.

Modern conference play 
In 2000, Gorman was appointed to the Board of the NSCAA in order to fill the vacancy left following the passing of Mike Berticelli. On Jan. 18, 2002, Gorman assumed the title of President of the NSCAA.

Gorman had a distinguished playing career in the Irish Football League located in Northern Ireland.

In 1976, Gorman emigrated to the United States to start his coaching career. In 1977, he was an assistant coach at Lock Haven University, leading the college to its first ever Division III national championship. In 1978, he was named head soccer coach at Elco High School in Pennsylvania, where he posted one of the most successful resumes in high school soccer history. His teams went 133-13-3, won five league championships, and captured the state championship in 1979.

In 1984, Gorman left to coach Davis & Elkins College to the 1984 Division II semifinals with a record of 13-3-3.

In April 2010, Gorman was named FC Dallas' technical director. As technical director, Gorman directed the club's player personnel operations, including international and domestic scouting, trades and acquisitions, player contracts and team administration. He also evaluated the development of FC Dallas Juniors prospects for the professional team. In December 2011 he was fired and later replaced as technical director by Fernando Clavijo.

His son, Trevor Gorman, is the head coach for the Albany Great Danes men's soccer team.

References

Year of birth missing (living people)
Place of birth missing (living people)
Living people
Davis & Elkins Senators men's soccer coaches
Lock Haven Bald Eagles men's soccer coaches
Penn State Nittany Lions men's soccer coaches
Alumni of Stranmillis University College
Association footballers from Northern Ireland
Association footballers not categorized by position
Football managers from Northern Ireland
Northern Ireland emigrants to the United States
Expatriate soccer managers in the United States
High school soccer coaches in the United States